Souffleurs De Vers is a Studio album by the French progressive rock band Ange. It was released in 2007.

Track listing
"Tous Les Boomerangs Du Monde"  – 04:52
"Les Écluses"  – 04:57
"Dieu Est Un Escroc"  – 08:15
"Nouvelles Du Ciel"  – 03:17
"Interlude"  – 02:01
"Où Vont Les Escargots ?"  – 04:20
"Coupée En Deux"  – 05:58
"Les Beaux Restes"  – 04:19
"Souffleurs De Vers [Synopsis]"  – 03:07
"Souffleurs De Vers [Le Film]"  – 16:43
"Journal Intime"  – 02:33

Personnel
Lead Vocals, Acoustic Guitar, Keyboards, Accordion: Christian Decamps
Vocals, Lead Vocals on "Coupée En Deux": Caroline Crozat
Keyboards, Backing Vocals, Lead Vocals on "Nouvelles Du Ciel": Tristan Decamps
Guitar, Backing Vocals: Hassan Hajdi
Bass, Backing Vocals: Thierry Sidhoum
Drums, Percussion: Benoît Cazzulini

References
Souffleurs De Vers on ange-updlm 
Souffleurs De Vers on www.discogs.com

Ange albums
2007 albums